Arcega is a surname of Spanish origin. It may refer to:

Fernando Arcega, Spanish basketball player, brother of José
J. J. Arcega-Whiteside, Spanish-American gridiron football player
José Arcega, Spanish basketball player, brother of Fernando
José Isidro Moreno Árcega, Mexican politician
Michael Arcega, Filipino-American sculptor and artist